Rambunctious is a historic funny car.

Debuting in 1969, Rambunctious is a reproduction 1969 Dodge Charger on a Logghe Stamping Company chassis. It became one of the most famous (and popular) funny cars in NHRA history. It would record NHRA's first official  pass, driven by Gene Snow and powered by a Keith Black-prepared Chrysler hemi.

Notes

Sources 

McClurg, Bob.  “50 Years of Funny Cars:  Part 2” in Drag Racer, November 2016, pp. 35–50.

1960s cars
1970s cars
Drag racing cars
Rear-wheel-drive vehicles